Syzygium tierneyanum, commonly known as river cherry, water cherry, or Bamaga satinash, is a tree in the family Myrtaceae which is native to New Guinea, the Solomon Islands, Vanuatu and north east Queensland. It often grows along watercourses where it is a facultative rheophyte.

Taxonomy
The river cherry was first described as Eugenia tierneyana in 1865 by Ferdinand von Mueller. It was reviewed and given its current binomial name in 1973 by Thomas Gordon Hartley and Lily May Perry.

Conservation
This species is listed by the Queensland Department of Environment and Science as least concern. , it has not been assessed by the IUCN.

Cultivation
This species has been widely planted as a park and street tree in the city of Cairns, Queensland.

Gallery

References

External links
 
 
 View a map of historical sightings of this species at the Australasian Virtual Herbarium
 View observations of this species on iNaturalist
 View images of this species on Flickriver

tierneyanum
Flora of Queensland
Taxa named by Ferdinand von Mueller
Taxa named by Thomas Gordon Hartley
Taxa named by Lily May Perry
Taxa described in 1865
Plants described in 1973